The 1998 edition of the Copa Libertadores was the 39th in the tournament's history. It was held between February 25 and August 26. Mexican clubs participated in Copa Libertadores for the first time. Vasco da Gama won the cup for the first time in the tournament's history, after defeating Barcelona of Ecuador in the final.

Pre-Libertadores

The 1998-I Pre-Libertadores tournament was played from 4 to 26 February 1998.

Teams
The following 21 teams from 10 associations (9 CONMEBOL members plus Mexico which obtained two slots via the Pre-Libertadores) qualified for the tournament:

Defending champions
All associations: 2 berths each

The entry stage is determined as follows:
Final stage: 1 team (Defending champions)
Group stage: 20 teams (two teams from each CONMEBOL association, and the top two teams from Pre-Libertadores tournament)

Group stage

Group 1

Group 2

Group 3

Group 4

Group 5

Final stages

Seeding

Bracket

Round of 16

Quarter-finals

Semi-finals

Finals

Champion

Top scorers

Broadcasting rights

Americas 
  Latin America: Sportsnet, TSN, TVC Sports, CMD and Best Cable Sports

References

1
Copa Libertadores seasons